In mathematics, a determinantal point process is a stochastic point process, the probability distribution of which is characterized as a determinant of some function. Such processes arise as important tools in random matrix theory, combinatorics, physics, and wireless network modeling.

Definition

Also, consider a measurable function .

for every n ≥ 1 and x1, ..., xn ∈ Λ.

Properties

Existence
The following two conditions are necessary and sufficient for the existence of a determinantal random point process with intensities ρk.
 Symmetry: ρk is invariant under action of the symmetric group Sk. Thus: 
 Positivity: For any N, and any collection of measurable, bounded functions  k = 1, ..., N with compact support: If  Then

Uniqueness
A sufficient condition for the uniqueness of a determinantal random process with joint intensities ρk is

for every bounded Borel

Examples

Gaussian unitary ensemble

where  is the th oscillator wave function defined by

Poissonized Plancherel measure
The poissonized Plancherel measure on partitions of integers (and therefore on Young diagrams) plays an important role in the study of the longest increasing subsequence of a random permutation. The point process corresponding to a random Young diagram, expressed in modified Frobenius coordinates, is a determinantal point process on  +  with the discrete Bessel kernel, given by:

where

For J the Bessel function of the first kind, and θ the mean used in poissonization.

This serves as an example of a well-defined determinantal point process with non-Hermitian kernel (although its restriction to the positive and negative semi-axis is Hermitian).

Uniform spanning trees
Let G be a finite, undirected, connected graph, with edge set E. Define Ie:E → ℓ2(E) as follows: first choose some arbitrary set of orientations for the edges E, and for each resulting, oriented edge e, define Ie to be the projection of a unit flow along e onto the subspace of ℓ2(E) spanned by star flows. Then the uniformly random spanning tree of G is a determinantal point process on E, with kernel
.

References

Point processes